Banelco (an acronym for Banca Electrónica Compartida) is an ATM network in Argentina. Established in 1985, it offers several services related to cash flow management, including debit cards, electronic transfers and service payments.

Banelco is owned by private banks and operates 6.000 ATMs (one third of the total in the country). Its main competitor in the Argentine market is Red Link. The company also operates Pagomiscuentas, an electronic bill payment service.

Member banks

Banks in Argentina which maintain Banelco ATMs include:

 Banco Comafi
 Banco del Sol
 Banco Galicia
 Banco Itaú
 Banco Macro
 Banco Patagonia
 Banco Regional del Cuyo
 Banco Santander Río
 Banco Supervielle
 BBVA Banco Francés
 Citi Bank
 HSBC Argentina
 ICBC Bank
 BRJFO AMUR

See also 
 Automated Teller Machine
  ATM Industry Association (ATMIA)

References

External links
 Official website

Banking in Argentina
Financial services companies established in 1985
Financial services companies of Argentina
Interbank networks
Argentine companies established in 1985